Costus malortieanus is a species of perennial herbaceous plants in the family Costaceae. It is found in Costa Rica, Nicaragua and Honduras.

See also 
 List of least concern plants

References

External links 
 
 
 Costus malortieanus at The Plant List
 Costus malortieanus at Tropicos

malortieanus
Flora of Costa Rica
Flora of Nicaragua
Flora of Honduras
Plants described in 1863